Pinyo Inpinit (Thai: ภิญโญ อินพินิจ, born July 1, 1993) is a Thai professional footballer who plays for Rajpracha in the Thai League 2.

International career

Pinyo Inpinit playing with Thailand national under-20 football team, he played latest in 2012 AFC U-19 Championship qualification. He debuted for the first team as a substitute against China in 2013. He represented Thailand U23 in the 2014 Asian Games. Pinyo is also part of Thailand's pre-squad in the 2014 AFF Championship.
He won the 2015 Southeast Asian Games with Thailand U23.

Thailand Selected Team

Pinyo was part of Thailand Selected Team which competed in the 2013 Merdeka Tournament.

International

International goals

under-23

Honours

Club
International

Thailand U-23
 Sea Games  Gold Medal (1); 2015

References

External links
 

1993 births
Living people
Pinyo Inpinit
Pinyo Inpinit
Association football forwards
Pinyo Inpinit
Pinyo Inpinit
Pinyo Inpinit
Pinyo Inpinit
Footballers at the 2014 Asian Games
Pinyo Inpinit
Southeast Asian Games medalists in football
Competitors at the 2015 Southeast Asian Games
Pinyo Inpinit